Sandor van der Heide (born 30 March 1978) is a Dutch football manager and former player, currently working as an assistant manager for SC Cambuur.

Career
Born in Ysbrechtum, Friesland, Van der Heide joined SC Cambuur, signing a professional contract in 1997.

He made his Cambuur debut in a 4–1 Eerste Divisie win over Telstar on 23 August 1997, coming on as a substitute for René van Rijswijk.

Coaching career
In March 2012 it was announced, that van der Heide would retire from professional football and join ONS Sneek as a playing assistant manager.

In May 2014, van der Heide returned to SC Cambuur as assistant manager of Henk de Jong but also stayed in a role as an advisor at ONS Sneek. On 10 November 2015, he stopped as assistant manager and continued as a scout and analyzer for the club. A few days later, he left the club and became manager of IJsselmeervogels. On 23 January 2017, he also accepted an offer from De Graafschap, becoming Henk de Jong's assistant manager on part-time, because he still was the manager of IJsselmeervogels. However, van der Heide decided to leave IJsselmeervogels with immediate effect on 17 August 2017 because he couldn't combine the two jobs. He was then hired on full-time by De Graafschap.

Ahead of the 2019-20 season, he once again returned to SC Cambuur as assistant manager of Henk de Jong.

References

External links
Sandor van der Heide at Cambuur.nl

1978 births
Living people
Dutch footballers
Dutch expatriate footballers
Association football midfielders
SC Cambuur players
SV Waldhof Mannheim players
Eredivisie players
Eerste Divisie players
Derde Divisie players
Expatriate footballers in Germany
Footballers from Friesland
People from Sneek
ONS Sneek players
Dutch expatriate sportspeople in Germany